This is a list of Italian television related events from 1956.

Events
26 February-5 March. The 1956 Winter Olympics in Cortina d'Ampezzo are the first major sport event covered by the RAI.
10 March - Franca Raimondi and Tonina Torrielli are selected to represent Italy at the 1956 Eurovision Song Contest, with "Aprite le finestre" performed by Raimondi and "Amami se vuoi" performed by Torrielli. They are selected to be the first Italian Eurovision entries during the Sanremo Music Festival held at Sanremo Casino.
24 May - Italy enters the Eurovision Song Contest for the first time with "Aprite le finestre", performed by Franca Raimondi and "Amami se vuoi", performed by Tonina Torrielli.
20 June - Resignation of Filiberto Guala, CEO of RAI since 1954. He was a skilled administrator,  but considered controversial for the bigoted decency codes which he imposed on television. He was replaced by Marcello Rodinò. Guala was a fervent Catholic, and would later become a Trappist monk.
19 December - Birth of the company Il tempo TV, aiming to create of the first Italian commercial network. Its president is Renato Angiolillo, owner and director of the Roman right-wing newspaper Il Tempo. After a four-years-long legal battle, the project is definitively stopped by a sentence of the Constitutional Court.
31 December - The covering of the Italian territory by the TV signal is completed.

Debuts

 L'amico degli animali (The animals' friend), hosted by Angelo Lombardi, educational show about zoology. The Lombardi's phrases "Hello, friends of my friends" and "Andalù, take it away", said to his African helper, become proverbial.
 Primo applauso (First applause), talent show, hosted by Enzo Tortora, who begins his long career as TV showman.
 La piazzetta (The little square), variety show. After three episodes, an exhibition of the dancer Alba Arnova with apparently bare legs (she wore a tight leotard) arouses L'Osservatore romano's protests and the show is deleted.

Television shows

 L’alfiere (The ensign), by Anton Giulio Majano, from Carlo Alianello, historical novel about the Italian unification, seen on the side of the army of the Two Sicilies; to notice the presence, in small roles, of some future stars, as Domenico Modugno, Monica Vitti and Nino Manfredi. 
 Cime tempestose (Wuthering Heights), by Mario Landi, from Emily Brontë, with Massimo Girotti as Heathcliff and Anna Maria Ferrero as Catherine Earnshaw.
 Il marziano Filippo (Filippo the Martian), by Cesare Emilio Gaslini, with Oreste Lionello, science-fiction miniserie for children; the plot is strangely similar to the E. T.’s one.

Ending this year

Births 

30 May – Piero Chiambretti, television presenter

Deaths

See also
List of Italian films of 1956

References